K-22 was a state highway in the U.S. state of Kansas. It served as a direct link from Wichita to Topeka and completely overlapped other routes. The highway was designated mid 1930, and was decommissioned March 25, 1938.

Route description
K-22 began in Wichita at a junction with US-54, K-96, US-81 and K-15. K-22 overlaps US-54 and K-96 east out of Wichita. From Augusta to El Dorado it overlapped US-77. In Tonovay the overlap with US-54 ended. In Emporia K-22 intersected US-50S and K-57. K-22 ended at K-4, K-10, US-40 and US-75 in Topeka.

Major junctions

See also

References

022
Transportation in Sedgwick County, Kansas
Transportation in Butler County, Kansas
Transportation in Greenwood County, Kansas
Transportation in Lyon County, Kansas
Transportation in Osage County, Kansas
Transportation in Shawnee County, Kansas